Xavier Mauméjean (born 30 December 1963) is a French writer. He teaches philosophy at a high school in Valenciennes, Northern France.

Books in French
 Les Mémoires de l'Homme-Eléphant, Le Masque (2000)
 Gotham, Le Masque (2002)
 La Ligue des héros, Mnémos (2002)
 L'Ere du Dragon (a sequel to La Ligue des Héros), Mnémos (2003)
 La Vénus anatomique, Mnémos (2004)
 Car je suis légion, Mnémos (2005)

As Editor:
 Les Nombreuses vies de Sherlock Holmes (with André-François Ruaud), Les moutons électriques (2005)
 Les Nombreuses vies d'Hercule Poirot (avec André-François Ruaud), Les moutons électriques (2006)

Books in English
 The League of Heroes (adaptation of La Ligue des héros by Manuella Chevalier and Jean-Marc Lofficier), Black Coat Press (2005) 

Xavier Mauméjean is also a regular contributor of short stories to the Tales of the Shadowmen series from Black Coat Press.

Awards
 Gérardmer Award (fantasy), 2000, for Les Mémoires de l'Homme-Eléphant
 Bob Morane / Imaginaire Award from the City of Brussels, 2003, for L'Ere du dragon
 Prix Rosny-Aîné (science fiction), 2005, for La Vénus anatomique

External links
Black Coat Press

French science fiction writers
French fantasy writers
1963 births
Living people
French male novelists